OC Media (Open Caucasus Media) is an independent online news platform covering news from the North and South Caucasus regions.

Overview 
OC Media is a Tbilisi-based website that publishes in English and Russian. The website was launched by journalists Mariam Nikuradze and Dominik K. Cagara and brings together journalists from throughout the Caucasus.

The site covers the South Caucasus nations of Armenia, Azerbaijan, and Georgia, Russia's North Caucasus republics, and the disputed territories of Abkhazia, Nagorno-Karabakh, and South Ossetia.

OC Media receives funding from different organizations and institutions as well as their readers. It has received funding from organizations such as UK Foreign and Commonwealth Office, Friedrich-Ebert-Stiftung, Open Society Foundations, the National Endowment for Democracy, the European Endowment for Democracy, the Ministry of Foreign Affairs of the Czech Republic, and the Thomson Reuters Foundation.

In March 2020, Georgian rights group the Human Rights Education and monitoring centre (EMC) appealed to the government after an undercover investigation by OC Media revealed poor working conditions in several textile factories in the country. They called on the Department of Labour Inspection to immediately inspect garment factories and for Parliament to pass legislative changes to prevent future violations of workers’ rights. 

In October 2020, the site was temporarily taken offline by a cyberattack. The outlet's management attributed the attack to their coverage of the 2020 Nagorno-Karabakh war.

References

External links
English-language website
Russian-language website

European news websites